Yudikha is a rural locality (a village) in Klyazminskoye Rural Settlement, Kovrovsky District, Vladimir Oblast, Russia. The population was 67 as of 2010.

Geography 
Yudikha is located on the Klyazma River, 36 km northeast of Kovrov (the district's administrative centre) by road. Doronikha is the nearest rural locality.

References 

Rural localities in Kovrovsky District